Bernard Richard Meirion Darwin CBE JP (7 September 1876 − 18 October 1961) a grandson of the British naturalist Charles Darwin, was a golf writer and high-standard amateur golfer. He was inducted into the World Golf Hall of Fame.

Biography
Born in Downe, Kent, Darwin was the son of Francis Darwin and Amy Ruck, his mother dying from a fever on 11 September, four days after his birth. He was the first grandson of Charles and Emma Darwin (see Darwin–Wedgwood family), and was brought up by them at their home, Down House. His younger half-sister from his father's second marriage to Ellen Wordswotth Crofts was the poet Frances Cornford.

Darwin was educated at Eton College, and graduated in law from Trinity College, Cambridge, where he was a Cambridge Blue in golf 1895-1897, and team captain in his final year.

Darwin married the engraver Elinor Monsell in 1906. They had one son, Sir Robert Vere Darwin, and two daughters; the potter Ursula Mommens, and Nicola Mary Elizabeth Darwin, later Hughes (1916–1976). During the First World War he served with the Royal Army Ordnance Corps in Macedonia as a lieutenant.

After Cambridge, Darwin became a court lawyer, but did not particularly enjoy that career, and gradually moved into journalism, despite having no formal training. He covered golf for The Times from 1907 to 1953 and for Country Life from 1907 to 1961, the first writer ever to cover golf on a daily basis, instead of as an occasional feature.

He played the game at an excellent level himself well into middle age, and competed in The Amateur Championship on 26 occasions across five decades between 1898 and 1935, with his best results being semi-final appearances in 1909 and 1921. In 1922, while in the United States to report on the first Walker Cup amateur team match between Britain and Ireland and the U.S., and also appointed as non-playing captain, Darwin was pressed into service at the last minute as a player, when one of the British team members, Robert Harris, was unable to play. He lost his team match, but won his singles match.

He was Captain of The Royal and Ancient Golf Club of St Andrews in 1934, and was President of the Golf Club Managers' Association (then the Association of Golf Club Secretaries) from 1933 to 1934 and then again from 1955 to 1958. Though mainly a golf writer, he also occasionally wrote on cricket, and prefaced the first edition of The Oxford Dictionary of Quotations. He was awarded CBE in the 1937 Coronation Honours.

Bernard Darwin was an authority on Charles Dickens. He frequently contributed the fourth leading article in The Times. The fourth Leader was devoted to flippant themes, and Darwin was known to insert quotes from or about Dickens in them. When Oxford Press issued all classics by Dickens around 1940, each with a foreword by a Dickensian scholar, Darwin was chosen to contribute the foreword to The Pickwick Papers. He was also asked by The Times to pen the main tribute to cricketer W.G. Grace when Grace's birth centenary was celebrated in 1948. The article has been included since in a few anthologies.

Bernard Darwin's works were kept in print by Herbert Warren Wind through his curated Classics of Golf Library.

In 2005, Darwin was elected to the World Golf Hall of Fame, in the Lifetime Achievement category.

He is buried in St Mary the Virgin Churchyard, Downe, Kent.

Bibliography
The World That Fred Made (Chatto & Windus, 1955) Autobiography
Bernard Darwin on Golf, 
The Golf Courses of the British Isles (1910)
Golf Is My Game (with Bobby Jones)
Playing the Like 
Golf
Green Memories
The Happy Golfer (his best articles from The American Golfer magazine, 1922–1936), 1997
James Braid, 1952
The classics of golf original edition of the Darwin sketchbook: Portraits of golf's greatest players and other selections from Bernard Darwin's writings, 1910–1955
Golf Between Two Wars (Chatto & Windus, 1944)
Darwin on the Green
 A Round with Darwin
Every Idle Dream (Illustrated by Elinor Darwin, Collins, 1948)
British Golf (Collins, 1946)
British clubs (1943)
Tee shots and others
Batsford Golf: Green Memories
A Friendly Round
A round of golf jokes
The Games's Afoot! (Sidgwick & Jackson Ltd., 1926)
Life Is Sweet Brother (Collins, 1940)
Pack Clouds Away (Collins, 1941)
Playing the like
Golfing By-Paths (Country Life Ltd., 1946)
A round of golf on the London & North Eastern Railway 
Second shots: Casual talks about golf
Out of the Rough
W. G. Grace: Great Lives (Duckworth, 1934)
The Robinsons of Bristol (E. S. & A. Robinson)
Eton v. Harrow at Lord's
Erasmus Darwin: Born 7 December 1881, killed in action 24 April 1915 
The Tale of Mr. Tootleoo, with Elinor Darwin 1925. (For children.)
Tootleoo Two, with Elinor Darwin 1927. (For children.)
Mr. Tootleoo and Co., with Elinor Darwin 1935. (For children.)
The Dickens advertiser: A collection of the advertisements in the original parts of novels by Charles Dickens (Elkin Mathews & Marrot, 1930) 
Fifty Years of Country Life (Country Life Ltd., 1947) (history of Country Life magazine)
Dickens: Great Lives (Duckworth, 1933)

Amateur wins
1919 Golf Illustrated Gold Vase

Results in major championships
Note: Darwin played in only The Amateur Championship.

NT = No tournament
DNP = Did not play
R512, R256, R128, R64, R32, R16, QF, SF = Round in which player lost in match play
Yellow background for top-10
Sources:

Team appearances
Walker Cup (representing Great Britain): 1922
England–Scotland Amateur Match (representing England): 1902, 1904, 1905, 1908, 1909, 1910 (winners), 1923, 1924 (winners)

References

External links 

Profile at golfonline.com
Articles by Bernard Darwin
SoHG Archives

1876 births
1961 deaths
Burials in Kent
Military personnel from Kent
People educated at Eton College
Alumni of Trinity College, Cambridge
British Army personnel of World War I
Royal Army Ordnance Corps officers
English male golfers
Amateur golfers
Golf writers and broadcasters
Cricket historians and writers
World Golf Hall of Fame inductees
British sportswriters
Commanders of the Order of the British Empire
Darwin–Wedgwood family
Country Life (magazine) people